is a former Japanese football player.

Career
He joined Fujieda MYFC after playing for Biwako Seikei Sport College before moving to Kataller Toyama in 2014

He made his first professional appearance, starting for Kataller Toyama against Montedio Yamagata in the J2 League on August 10, 2014.

References

External links

1990 births
Living people
Biwako Seikei Sport College alumni
Association football people from Mie Prefecture
Sportspeople from Mie Prefecture
Japanese footballers
J2 League players
Japan Football League players
Fujieda MYFC players
Kataller Toyama players
Association football goalkeepers